Pierre de Savoye (born 12 November 1942 in Montreal, Quebec) was a member of the House of Commons of Canada from 1993 to 2000. He is a professor and consultant by career.

He was elected in the Portneuf electoral district under the Bloc Québécois party in the 1993 and 1997 federal elections, thus serving in the 35th and 36th Canadian Parliaments. Pierre de Savoye left Canadian politics in 2000 as he did not seek a third term in that year's federal election.

External links
 

1942 births
Bloc Québécois MPs
Living people
Members of the House of Commons of Canada from Quebec
Politicians from Montreal
People from Capitale-Nationale